Alumni Stadium is a 7,193-seat multi-purpose stadium in Dover, Delaware. It is home to the Delaware State University Hornets football team and outdoor men's and women's track and field teams. The facility opened in 1957.

See also
 List of NCAA Division I FCS football stadiums

References

External links
Delaware State Hornets Athletic Facilities

American football venues in Delaware
Athletics (track and field) venues in Delaware
College football venues
College lacrosse venues in the United States
College soccer venues in the United States
College track and field venues in the United States
Delaware State Hornets
Delaware State Hornets football
Multi-purpose stadiums in the United States
Soccer venues in Delaware
Buildings and structures in Dover, Delaware
Sports venues completed in 1957